This is a list of films produced by the Telugu language film industry based in Hyderabad in the year 2002.

Box office

January–June

July–December

References 

2002
Telugu
Telugu films